Famous Jury Trials is a dramatized court show that first appeared on radio, followed by television, and then in the movies. The series ran on radio from 1936 through 1949, then on television from 1949 through 1952, and finally in a movie in 1971. On television, it aired on the now-defunct DuMont Television Network.

Broadcast history
Famous Jury Trials first aired on October 12, 1949, on DuMont, and was a live dramatized court show   with each episode lasting 30 minutes. During the first season, the show aired Wednesdays at 9:30pm EST. During later seasons, the show aired Wednesdays at 9pm EST. The final show aired March 12, 1952.

Production
Frank Bunetta and C. Harrell were the directors, and John L. Clark was the writer. The program originated from WABD and was sponsored by Chevrolet Dealers.

Episodes
June 4, 1950 - "People vs. William Tait" - Lenore Aubert, Lynn Salisbury
July 9, 1950 - "The People vs. Jack Pelt"
July 16, 1950 - "State vs. William Townsend"

Episode status
No episodes are confirmed to survive, however an episode may possibly exist at the Paley Center for Media.

See also
Famous Jury Trials (radio program)
List of programs broadcast by the DuMont Television Network
List of surviving DuMont Television Network broadcasts

References

Bibliography
David Weinstein, The Forgotten Network: DuMont and the Birth of American Television (Philadelphia: Temple University Press, 2004) 
Alex McNeil, Total Television, Fourth edition (New York: Penguin Books, 1980) 
Tim Brooks and Earle Marsh, The Complete Directory to Prime Time Network TV Shows, Third edition (New York: Ballantine Books, 1964)

External links
Famous Jury Trials at IMDb
DuMont historical website
Interview with Joyce Randolph about her TV career, including Famous Jury Trials

1949 American television series debuts
1952 American television series endings
American live television series
Black-and-white American television shows
DuMont Television Network original programming
Dramatized court shows